Prince Lev Vladimirovich Urusov (Saint Petersburg — , Paris) was a Russian diplomat. From 1910 until his death, he was a member of International Olympic Committee.

Life 
Lev Urusov was born in the family of State Councillor and Chamberlain Vladimir Pavlovich Urusov. In 1898 he graduated from Alexandrovski Lyceum in Saint Petersburg and from the same year started his career at the Ministry of Foreign Affairs. His two big assignments came in 1910-1912 when he was appointed a head of Russian diplomatic mission in Bulgaria, and then in 1912-1916 when he served as the first secretary at the Russian embassy in Japan. In 1917, after February Revolution in Russia, Lev Urusov emigrated to France and lived there till his death in 1933.

Prince Urusov was one of the leading tennis players of Russia those years. In 1907 he won the Championship of Saint Petersburg, and the next year he became the Champion of Russia. In 1913, during his diplomatic mission in Japan, he won the Open Championship of Tokyo. In 1910, he was elected a member of International Olympic Committee. He retained this position even after the revolution, and remained, while living in France, the only official representative of Russia in IOC. After the end of the World War he repeatingly submitted proposals for incorporating Russian teams back to the Olympic movement. Toward the 1920 Olympic he suggested that a team of Russian emigrants may compete, while four years later he asked for the participation of two teams, one composed of the emigrants and another representing Soviet Russia. The proposals were rejected, and Pierre de Coubertin later wrote that he regretted this rejection. The rejection was based on the fact that the Soviet Russia has not been recognized yet by the IOC while the emigrants were not representing a distinct existing country.

In 2008, Prince Lev Urusov was inducted into the Tennis Hall of Fame of Russia. Reporters were informed that no relatives of Lev Urusov remained in Russia and that his award will wait in  Russia till his relatives abroad claim it.

References

External links 
 Lev Vladimirovich Urusov in the Big Encyclopedia of Olympics (in Russian)
 Lev Vladimirovich Urusov in the Russian Tennis Encyclopedia (in Russian)
 Lev Urusov's genealogy at the Rodovid portal (in Russian)

1877 births
1933 deaths
International Olympic Committee members
Diplomats of the Russian Empire
Male tennis players from the Russian Empire
Diplomats from Saint Petersburg
Sportspeople from Saint Petersburg